Paul Bishop may refer to:
 Paul Bishop (police officer), American police officer and crime writer
 Paul Bishop (actor) (born 1966), Australian actor and politician
 Paul C. Bishop (born 1967), British scholar and William Jacks Chair in Modern Languages at the University of Glasgow

See also
 Bishop (surname)